Günther Lorenz (17 September 1915 – February 1999) was a German figure skater. He competed in the men's singles event at the 1936 Winter Olympics.

References

1915 births
1999 deaths
German male single skaters
Olympic figure skaters of Germany
Figure skaters at the 1936 Winter Olympics
Place of birth missing